was a town located in Kaijō District, Chiba Prefecture, Japan.

Iioka was a noted port town in the Edo period, and prospered greatly in the aftermath of the Great Fire of Meireki in 1657, as a transshipment center for timber and building materials to Edo.

Modern Iioka was formed on April 1, 1889. On March 31, 1954 it expanded through annexation of the villages of Sangawa and a part of Toyooka.

On July 1, 2005, Iioka was merged with the city of Asahi, the town of Hikata (from Katori District), and the town of Unakami (also from Kaijō District) to form the new Asahi city, and it disappeared.

In April 2005 (the last data available before its merger into Asahi), the town had an estimated population of 8,042 and a population density of 600 persons per km². Its total area was 18.27 km².

Cultural References
 Iioka is the setting for the first film in the classic Japanese blind swordsman series: The Tale of Zatoichi.

External links
 Asahi official website 

Dissolved municipalities of Chiba Prefecture
Asahi, Chiba